Oti is a village in Mulgi Parish in Viljandi County in southern Estonia. It borders the villages Hirmuküla, Karksi, Pärsi and Morna.

References

Villages in Viljandi County